Whittier Union High School District is a California high school district serving most of the city of Whittier, the unincorporated communities of East Whittier, South Whittier, West Whittier-Los Nietos and Rose Hills, and parts of Norwalk, La Mirada, Downey, Santa Fe Springs and La Habra Heights. The union high school district was formed in 1900 and is currently composed of five comprehensive high schools, two alternative high schools, and an adult education center. Combined, these schools serve over 13,000 students. The school district is overseen by its current Superintendent, Dr. Monica Oviedo. The Board of Trustees is composed of five members, elected by trustee areas. The elections are currently held on a Tuesday after the first Monday in November of even-numbered years.

Schools

High schools 
 Whittier High School, founded in 1900 and located in Whittier (uptown)
 Pioneer High School, founded in 1959 and located in West Whittier
 California High School, founded in 1953 and located in South Whittier
 Santa Fe High School, founded in 1955 and located in Santa Fe Springs 
 La Serna High School, founded in 1961 and located in Whittier (friendly hills)

Alternative Education 
 Frontier High School
 Sierra Vista High School
 Whittier Adult School

Closed schools 
 Monte Vista High School closed 1979
 Sierra High School closed 1979

Feeder districts
 East Whittier City School District in East Whittier
 Little Lake City School District in Santa Fe Springs
 Los Nietos School District in Los Nietos
 South Whittier School District in South Whittier
 Whittier City School District in Whittier

See also
 List of school districts in California
 List of high schools in Los Angeles County, California

References

External links
 

School districts in Los Angeles County, California
School districts established in 1900
Whittier, California
1900 establishments in California